Federico Balzaretti (born 6 December 1981) is an Italian former professional footballer who played as a left-sided full-back, currently in charge as director of football of Vicenza.

A product of the Torino youth system, his first experience as a professional footballer was on loan to Varese and Siena, returning to Turin to play a year in Serie A and two in Serie B. Later he moved to Juventus, playing a year in Serie A and the Champions League and winning the Scudetto, later revoked for the events of Calciopoli and the next season in the lower division that ended in promotion. Sold to Fiorentina in 2007, after half a season he moved to Palermo, with whom he played in the Europa League. In 2010, he was called up to the Italian national team and took part in the 2012 UEFA European Championship, where Italy lost the final against Spain. The same summer, he moved to Roma. After struggling with injuries, on 12 August 2015, he announced his retirement from football after having made a total of 221 appearances and scored 4 goals in Serie A and 130 appearances and 3 goals in Serie B.

Club career

Torino
Balzaretti began his playing career at the age of 6 for hometown club Torino, playing in the various youth teams. He soon gained a reputation as an athletic wing-back with enormous potential, and was soon loaned out to provincial sides Varese and Siena between 1999 and 2002. A local, Balzaretti identified with the supporters and shortly became a symbol for Torino supporters, kissing the badge under the curva at the end of games.

In 2004–05, he was heavily involved in the campaign for promotion, which brought the team back to Serie A. However, the promotion, achieved on the field, was lost during the difficult pre-season retreat after the bankruptcy of Torino Calcio. Balzaretti, as all the other players, were released and allowed to come to agreements with other teams.

Juventus
On 15 August 2005, Balzaretti was signed by cross-city rivals Juventus on a free transfer. "It was a hard decision," Balzaretti said. "But I only moved to Juve because I was promised I would stay and not be sold. I can't lie that the thought of staying in Turin, my home, was a big factor." His first wife, Jessica, was then pregnant with daughter Lucretia, influencing his stay in Piedmont. The move was interpreted as an act of betrayal by the Torino faithful (Balzaretti, having previously sworn eternal love for his former club) which have, ever since, booed and insulted him whenever he returns to Turin.

In 2005–06 he was part of the first team for the bianconeri, often playing as regular under orders of coach Fabio Capello, and finally winning the Serie A league. His first ever senior goal came on 17 February 2007, in Serie B, as Juventus beat Crotone 5–0.

Fiorentina and Palermo

Balzaretti was sold to Fiorentina in July 2007 for €3.8 million fee, but failed to adjust with the Viola as he made only six appearances in the first half of the Serie A 2007-08, and was subsequently signed by Palermo on a -year contract in a permanent move (loan with an option to buy according to financial report) during the January transfer market, also for €3.8m (€1.27m for loan plus €2.53m).

At Palermo, Balzaretti took the #42 jersey as a homage to his father, who was born in 1942; in his tenure with the Sicilian side, he immediately established himself as a mainstay, playing regularly for the rosanero also in the following seasons and establishing as one of the most praised Italian left backs.

In January 2010, Balzaretti signed a new -year contract.

Roma

On 1 August 2012, Balzaretti signed a three-year contract with Roma, for a fee of €4.5 million.
He made his debut in a 2–2 draw against Catania, during the 2012–13 season. He scored his first goal for Roma in the Derby della capitale match against Lazio, on 22 September 2013; Roma won the game 2–0. During his second season at the club, however, Balzaretti suffered a severe case of athletic pubalgia following Roma's match against Sassuolo, on 10 November 2013, which threatened to end his career; due to the pain in his pelvis, he had to undergo several operations. He finally returned to the pitch on the final match of the 2014–15 season, in a 2–1 home defeat to his former club Palermo, on 31 May 2015.

Retirement
On 12 August 2015, Balzaretti declared his retirement from professional football. He stated that failing to fully recover from the hip injury that he had battled with for the past two years was the reason for him to quit for good at the age of 33. The following is taken from Balzaretti's public statement:

International career

After playing with a number of youth selections between 2000 and 2002, Balzaretti made his debut with the Italian national team under coach Cesare Prandelli on 17 November 2010, in a friendly match against Romania. 
He has been selected in the Italian team for UEFA Euro 2012, becoming the starting left-back in the third match at the group stage as Italy moved from 3–5–2 to 4–4–2. He also played the entire match against Germany as a right-back due to absences of Christian Maggio who was suspended and Ignazio Abate who was injured but stayed on the bench, conceding a penalty during stoppage time, but also helping his team to reach the tournament final.

Style of play
An offensive-minded, left-sided full-back, who was also capable of playing as a winger, wing-back, or as a wide-midfielder, Balzaretti's main attributes were his pace, stamina, and crossing ability. A tactically versatile player, he was also capable of playing on the right side of the pitch.

Post-playing career
Following his retirement, Balzaretti agreed to stay at Roma, working under Roma sporting director Walter Sabatini. He stated, “I will now form part of the sports management staff here at Roma. It's something I like and feel is right for me."

On 2 November 2021 he was announced as the new director of football of struggling Serie B club Vicenza.

Personal life
Balzaretti is married to renowned Italian ballerina Eleonora Abbagnato; their wedding took place in summer of 2011 in Palermo. They have two children. Balzaretti has two children from a previous relationship.

Career statistics

Club

International
Source:

Honours

Club
Juventus
 Serie B: 2006–07

Roma
 Coppa Italia: 2012–13 Runner-up

International
Italy
 UEFA European Championship: 2012 Runner-up

Individual
 Serie A Team of the Year: 2011–12

References

External links

Career profile  at US Palermo official website

1981 births
Living people
Footballers from Turin
Italian footballers
Association football defenders
Juventus F.C. players
ACF Fiorentina players
Torino F.C. players
A.C.N. Siena 1904 players
Palermo F.C. players
S.S.D. Varese Calcio players
A.S. Roma players
Serie A players
Serie B players
Serie C players
Italy youth international footballers
Italy under-21 international footballers
Italy international footballers
UEFA Euro 2012 players
Mediterranean Games silver medalists for Italy
Mediterranean Games medalists in football
Competitors at the 2001 Mediterranean Games